Hakea rostrata, common name beaked hakea, is a flowering plant in the family Proteaceae, native to South Australia and Victoria.

Description
Hakea rostrata is a spreading shrub growing to 1–4 m high. Its branchlets and young leaves are hairy with the hairs lying close to the branchlet or leaf. The ascending leaves are terete, 2–15 cm long and 0.8–1.7 mm wide, and are not grooved. The inflorescence 1–10-flowered on a knob-like rachis. The  pedicel is 2.5–6.5 mm long, and densely hairy. The perianth is 3.5–5.5 mm long, and hairy at the base. The pistil is 7.8–11.5 mm long, with an oblique disc as  pollen presenter. The fruit is roughly at right-angle to stalk, is sigmoid in shape, and 2.2–4.5 cm long and 1.8–3.2 cm wide. It is coarsely wrinkled, sometimes finely black-warted. The beak is reflexed and  narrow, 7–14 mm long, appressed against ventral face, with obscure horns. The seed does not occupy the whole valve face and is  black with a lighter apex. In Victoria, it flowers from July to November.

In Victoria it occurs through a range of heathlands and heathy woodlands in the west and south-west, mostly on sandy soils.

In Victoria,  where Hakea rostrata and H. rugosa grow together, Hakea rostrata may be distinguished from H. rugosa by "its curved rather than straight leaves, curved rather than straight style, its oblique disc rather than a cone as a pollen presenter and its larger fruits."

Taxonomy
Ferdinand von Mueller first named the species in 1853, but failed to adequately publish the new species. The name was first validly published by Carl Meissner in 1854.

Etymology 
The specific epithet, rostrata, derives from the Latin, rostratum, beaked (from rostrum, beak).

References

External links
eFloraSA Electronic Flora of South Australia factsheet: Hakea rostrata

rostrata
Plants described in 1854
Flora of South Australia
Flora of Victoria (Australia)
Taxa named by Ferdinand von Mueller
Proteales of Australia
Taxa named by Carl Meissner